Rodier is a French surname. Notable people with the surname include:

Charles-Séraphin Rodier (disambiguation), multiple people
Clément Rodier (1839–1904), French Christian missionary
Denis Rodier, Canadian comics artist
Derek Rodier (born 1959), Scottish footballer
Édouard-Étienne Rodier (1804–1840), Canadian lawyer and politician
François Pierre Rodier (1854–?), French colonial governor
Yves Rodier (born 1967), Canadian cartoonist

French-language surnames